The 1995–96 WHL season was the 30th season for the Western Hockey League (WHL).  Seventeen teams completed a 72-game season.  The Brandon Wheat Kings won the President's Cup.

League notes
The Calgary Hitmen joined the WHL as its 17th franchise, playing in the Central division.
The Tacoma Rockets relocated to Kelowna, British Columbia to become the Kelowna Rockets.
The WHL divided into three divisions: The East and Central divisions formed the Eastern Conference, and consisted of five teams per division.  The West division was made up of the seven B.C. and U.S.-based teams.
The playoff format was changed so that the top eight teams in the Eastern Conference and the top six in the West division qualified.  The 14 playoff qualifiers all played best-of-seven series in the first round.  The East semifinals were best-of-seven affairs, while the highest remaining seed in the West earned a bye.  The remaining two West teams played a best of five series.  Conference and League final series were best of seven.

Regular season

Final standings

Scoring leaders
Note: GP = Games played; G = Goals; A = Assists; Pts = Points; PIM = Penalties in minutes

1996 WHL Playoffs

All-Star game

On January 23, the Eastern Conference defeated the Western Conference 10–7 at Prince George, British Columbia before a crowd of 5,992.

Awards

All-Star Teams

See also
1996 Memorial Cup
1996 NHL Entry Draft
1995 in sports
1996 in sports

References
whl.ca
 2005–06 WHL Guide

Western Hockey League seasons
WHL
WHL